Solomon Samuel Townsend III (May 21, 1850 – November 18, 1910) was an American politician from New York.

Life 
Solomon was born on May 21, 1850, in Manhattan. He was the son of Solomon Samuel Townsend II and Helene DeKay. He lived most of his life in Oyster Bay, where as a boy he was playmates with the Roosevelt family. His father was a member of the New York state legislature and a member of the 1846 and 1867 New York State Constitutional Conventions.

After graduating from the Oyster Bay Parish School and New York University, Solomon worked as a coal merchant in Oyster Bay.

In 1888, Solomon was elected to the New York State Assembly as a Democrat, representing the Queens County 1st District. He served in the Assembly in 1889, 1890, 1891, 1892, and 1893.

Solomon was a delegate to the 1892 Democratic National Convention.

Solomon was later appointed to be clerk of the Queens County Board of Supervisors and Collector of Arrearages of Taxes of Queens County.

Solomon died in Nassau Hospital (today NYU Winthrop Hospital) on November 18, 1910. He was buried in the Memorial Cemetery of Saint John's Church, Laurel Hollow.

References

External links 
 The Political Graveyard

1850 births
1910 deaths
People from Oyster Bay (town), New York
New York University alumni
Democratic Party members of the New York State Assembly
19th-century American politicians
Burials in New York (state)
Tax collectors
Politicians from Manhattan